The 1995 Dunhill Cup was the 11th Dunhill Cup. It was a team tournament featuring 16 countries, each represented by three players. The Cup was played 19–22 October at the Old Course at St Andrews in Scotland. The sponsor was the Alfred Dunhill company. The Scottish team of Andrew Coltart, Colin Montgomerie, and Sam Torrance beat the Zimbabwean team of Tony Johnstone, Mark McNulty, and Nick Price in the final.

Format
The Cup was a match play event played over four days. The teams were divided into four four-team groups. The top eight teams were seeded with the remaining teams randomly placed in the groups. After three rounds of round-robin play, the top team in each group advanced to a single elimination playoff.

In each team match, the three players were paired with their opponents and played 18 holes at medal match play. Matches tied at the end of 18 holes were extended to a sudden-death playoff. The tie-breaker for ties within a group was based on match record, then head-to-head.

Group play

Round one
Source:

Group 1

Group 2

Group 3

Group 4

Round two
Source:

Group 1

Johannsson won on the first playoff hole.

Group 2

Group 3

Group 4

Round three
Source:

Group 1

Stewart won on the first playoff hole.

Walton won on the first playoff hole.

Group 2

Group 3

Group 4

Standings

Playoffs
Source:

Bracket

Semi-finals

Final

Team results

Player results

References

Alfred Dunhill Cup
Dunhill Cup
Dunhill Cup
Dunhill Cup